Matthew VanDyke (born June 11, 1979) is an American documentary filmmaker, revolutionary, and former journalist. He gained fame during the Libyan Civil War as a foreign fighter on the side of the uprising and as a prisoner of war.

As a journalist and documentary filmmaker, VanDyke traveled throughout North Africa and the Middle East by motorcycle from 2007 to 2011. His experiences and observations during these four years led him to join the Libyan Civil War as a rebel fighter. VanDyke has publicly supported Arab spring revolutions in the Middle East and North Africa and has worked as a filmmaker in the Syrian Civil War and fought as an armed combatant.

Early life

Education 
In 2002, VanDyke received his bachelor's degree in Political Science from the University of Maryland, Baltimore County (UMBC), graduating summa cum laude.

At UMBC, VanDyke first began to study the Arab world. VanDyke later studied in the Security Studies Program (SSP) at Georgetown University's Walsh School of Foreign Service from 2002 to 2004. He received his master's degree in Security Studies with a Middle East regional concentration in 2004. As a graduate student at Georgetown University he wrote a political column for the campus newspaper, The Hoya, and co-hosted a radio talk show on the Georgetown University radio station, WGTB. VanDyke is a member of Mensa, a social organization whose members are in the top 2% of intelligence as measured by an IQ test entrance exam.

Motorcycle journey 
In 2004, VanDyke graduated from the Georgetown University School of Foreign Service with a master's degree in Security Studies with a Middle East concentration. His desire to see the Arab World for himself led him to supplement his academic pursuits with two long introspective journeys that would fundamentally change the way he viewed himself and the Arab World.
The first expedition from 2007 to 2009 was a solo trip through North Africa and the Middle East on a Kawasaki KLR650 motorcycle that included journeys in Morocco, Mauritania, Tunisia, Libya, Egypt, Jordan, and Syria. This was followed in 2010 by a six-month motorcycle trek from Iraq, through Iran, to Afghanistan. For the latter, he traveled with his friend American photographer Daniel Britt, with the final goal of spending a few weeks embedded to film the US military in Afghanistan.

VanDyke made several close friends in Tripoli, Libya in 2008; those friendships were instrumental in making his decision to fight in the Libyan Civil War in 2011. VanDyke lived in Iraq later in 2008 and 2009, teaching English at a University to fund his motorcycle journey. He also filmed the US military in Iraq and briefly worked as a war correspondent.

VanDyke filmed his motorcycle journeys from 2007 to 2010 and some of the footage was used in the feature documentary about VanDyke, Point and Shoot, which won the Best Documentary Award at the Tribeca Film Festival in 2014.

Libyan Civil War 
In February 2011, the Libyan Civil War began, and VanDyke was in contact with several of his Libyan friends in Tripoli via email and Facebook. "My friends were telling me about family members being arrested or disappearing or being injured.  They would say to me things like, 'Why doesn’t anybody help us?' So I said I would be there."

VanDyke went to Libya with the intention of joining the rebel force opposing the government of Muammar Gaddafi. At the time, there was no international military support for the rebels, and it appeared that NATO would not intervene. Gaddafi had air superiority and his military was significantly stronger than the rebel force. "I knew that they needed people to go fight. There was no NATO at that time. It didn't look like there would be NATO involvement or foreign involvement. It was a very, very desperate situation of Gaddafi's army moving towards Benghazi, and it was an all or nothing situation."

Prisoner of war 
On 13 March 2011, VanDyke was struck on the head during an ambush in Brega and lost his memory of what happened. VanDyke regained consciousness briefly during his transport from Brega to a prison, which he believes was in Sirte. He was interrogated and told he would never see America again.

Sometime within the next 24–48 hours VanDyke was flown to Tripoli, where he was imprisoned in the Maktab al-Nasser prison in the Abu Salim district of Tripoli. VanDyke was held in solitary confinement, in a 1.2m x 2.2m (4 ft x 7 ft) cell with a small skylight in the ceiling. He was fed and allowed to use the toilet three times a day, but was not allowed outside or given anything to read or other materials. VanDyke also suffered the psychological effects of solitary confinement.

After 85 days VanDyke was blindfolded, handcuffed, and transported to Abu Salim prison, where he would spend the next 81 days, also in solitary confinement. The psychological torture of the solitary confinement was made worse by VanDyke's obsessive-compulsive disorder. Prisoners broke the lock off his cell on August 24, 2011 and he escaped prison. Free from prison, VanDyke stayed at the home of a fellow escapee for a few days before relocating to the Corinthia Hotel Tripoli as a guest of the National Transitional Council, and spoke to reporters about his experience as a prisoner of war.

International media coverage 

Shortly after his capture was reported, he was incorrectly described by the media as a freelance journalist. Several non-governmental organizations (NGOs), including the Committee to Protect Journalists, attempted to pressure the Gaddafi government on his behalf. On May 25, Deputy Libyan Foreign Minister Khaled Kaim said he had no information about VanDyke. In early August, after nearly five months of denials, the Gaddafi government finally admitted that VanDyke was in custody, but would not allow anyone to speak with or visit him, and would not reveal which prison he was being held in. Human Rights Watch visited Abu Salim prison and asked if VanDyke was being held there. Prison officials denied that he was there, when in fact he was.

VanDyke also stated that he would not leave Libya until the country was free and all cities were liberated from Gaddafi's forces. He also said he would not leave until all rebel Prisoners of War (POWs) being held by Gaddafi forces were rescued from prison, including the three rebel fighters he was captured with.  VanDyke has been compared to foreign fighters of the International Brigades during the Spanish Civil War.  He appears regularly in the media as a media personality and media commentator.

Joining the National Liberation Army 
VanDyke went to Ra's Lanuf, meeting with the commander of the Ali Hassan al-Jaber Brigade, who allowed them to enlist in the National Liberation Army.

VanDyke remained on or near the front lines as the rebels advanced from Harawa to Sirte. At the Battle of Sirte he took part in heavy fighting on the eastern front, most notably near Jazeera, Sirte Hotel, Sirte University, Dubai Street, and the Emirates apartment complex, as well as other engagements. During this time VanDyke used a variety of weapons in combat and served in a variety of roles, but was primarily a DShK (Dushka) gunner. When not in combat, Fonas and VanDyke often gave tours of the battlefield and assisted the international press to help them safely and reliably report on the Battle of Sirte. During one such mission they escorted CBS News correspondent Allen Pizzey and his crew to the front lines in Sirte, at which time VanDyke was filmed in combat. This was aired on the CBS Evening News in the United States, and was the first combat footage of VanDyke to emerge. Additional footage of him fighting in Sirte would later be made public in American television broadcasts and online.

Film career

Not Anymore: A Story of Revolution 

Upon returning to the United States from Libya at the end of 2011, VanDyke was asked by the press at the airport about his future plans. He stated that he would be working in other revolutions, including likely participation as an armed combatant at some point in the future. In 2012 VanDyke began preparations to make a short documentary film, Not Anymore: A Story of Revolution, to help improve world opinion of the Syrian rebel forces in the Syrian Civil War and encourage the international community to support them. VanDyke has stated that his decision to film instead of fight at that stage of the war was based on equipment shortages among the rebels, a problem that he felt his film could help address by increasing international support. He self-financed the film with his own money, spending approximately $30,000.

VanDyke traveled to Syria in October 2012 and filmed for around a month in the city of Aleppo.  Filming in Aleppo was dangerous because of artillery barrages, aircraft attacks, snipers, and the threat of kidnapping because of VanDyke's status as a public figure. While in Syria making Not Anymore: A Story of Revolution, the Syrian government broadcast on numerous Syrian State Television channels that VanDyke was a terrorist who had come to fight against the government as part of the rebel Free Syrian Army, greatly increasing the risk that VanDyke would be kidnapped or assassinated in Syria.

Release and reception
Not Anymore: A Story of Revolution was released in September 2013. It was broadcast on television by ARD in Germany, SBS in Australia, and NRK in Norway. Footage from the film was also shown as part of a 2013 episode of ABC's program Nightline. VanDyke released Not Anymore: A Story of Revolution on YouTube without advertising. The film is also available online through The Guardian's Comment is Free subsite. Not Anymore: A Story of Revolution has also been shown at educational institutions and events around the world sponsored by organizations such as Amnesty International and The Frontline Club.

The film was described by NewFilmmakers LA Film Festival as "a film festival darling". The film has won over 100 awards, including the Short Film Award at the One World Media Awards, and First Place (Non Fiction) in the 36th Annual National Short Film Competition at the USA Film Festival as well as taking Best Film for the 2013 ITSA Film Festival.

Point and Shoot

VanDyke starred in Point and Shoot, a documentary film written and directed by two-time Academy Award nominee Marshall Curry.  VanDyke had approached Curry to collaborate on a biographical film about VanDyke using footage he had shot during the motorcycle journey and while fighting in Libya. The film consists primarily of VanDyke's footage from 2007 to 2011, which is combined with some interviews and a short animation sequence to recreate VanDyke's experience in solitary confinement as a prisoner of war.

Point and Shoot follows VanDyke's four year motorcycle journey, his friendship with Nouri Fonas and other Libyans, and his transformation into a revolutionary during the conflict in Libya. The film explores VanDyke's background, motivations, and the formative experiences during his motorcycle journey that led to his transformation into a revolutionary during the conflict in Libya.

Point and Shoot premiered at Tribeca Film Festival in April 2014 where it won the Best Documentary Award.  The film also won the Independent Film Festival of Boston Special Jury Prize for Documentary Feature and VanDyke was awarded the Special Jury Award for Extraordinary Courage in Filmmaking by the Little Rock Film Festival for his work as producer and cinematographer on Point and Shoot.

The film has a 72% positive rating on Rotten Tomatoes. and a positive Metascore of 65 on Metacritic.

7 Days in Syria

VanDyke was the cinematographer and producer of the 2015 documentary 7 Days in Syria directed by Robert Rippberger and produced by Scott Rosenfelt, following lauded journalist Janine di Giovanni. The film showed at three dozen festivals, including a private screening to Britain's House of Lords and to senior members of the United Nations, before it was released by Ro*co Films and Film Buff.

Combat advisor

On February 21, 2015, VanDyke announced the creation of Sons of Liberty International, a self-described non-profit security contracting firm, consisting of him and several veterans. Their efforts in 2015 were directed toward training the Nineveh Plain Protection Units (NPU), an Assyrian militia backed by the Assyrian Democratic Movement, with the stated intent of preserving Iraq's Christian heritage against attacks from the Islamic State of Iraq and Syria.  In February 2015, he said they had helped train over 300 soldiers of the NPU, with the goal of training a total of 2000 soldiers.  Deflecting criticism that raising a Christian militia will only fuel sectarianism in the region, he stated that the NPU would eventually enlist other religious groups as well.

During the 2022 Russian invasion of Ukraine, SOLI has provided training to Ukrainian soldiers.

Filmography 
 Not Anymore: A Story of Revolution (2013)
 Point and Shoot (2014)
 7 Days in Syria (2015)

References

External links

American male journalists
Living people
People of the First Libyan Civil War
American prisoners of war
American people imprisoned abroad
Prisoners and detainees of Libya
1979 births
Film directors from Maryland
Walsh School of Foreign Service alumni
University of Maryland, Baltimore County alumni
Mensans